The Family Group is an outdoor sculpture by Charles Umlauf, installed outside the McCombs School of Business on the University of Texas at Austin campus in Austin, Texas, United States. The statue group represents the "most basic economic unit of society".

References

Outdoor sculptures in Austin, Texas
Sculptures of men in Texas
Sculptures of women in Texas
Statues in Austin, Texas
University of Texas at Austin campus